Ray Parker (27 January 1925 - January 2006) was an English professional footballer who played as a centre half.

Career 
Born in Doncaster, Parker played in the Football League for Chesterfield, Sheffield Wednesday and Bradford City. He also played non-league football for Buxton and Kettering Town.

References 

1925 births
2006 deaths
English footballers
Chesterfield F.C. players
Sheffield Wednesday F.C. players
Bradford City A.F.C. players
Buxton F.C. players
Kettering Town F.C. players
English Football League players
Association football defenders